"No Fate" is a single by Zyon released in 1991/1992.

Track listing 
Vinyl
 "No Fate (No Fate Mix)" – 5:35
 "No Fate (Continuous Struggle Mix)" – 6:12

Scooter cover version 

The German hard dance band Scooter covered it, which was released on 1 December 1997 and featured on their first singles compilation album Rough and Tough and Dangerous – The Singles 94/98.

Track listing 
CD Maxi
 "No Fate (Single Mix)" – 3:28
 "No Fate (Full Length)" – 6:24
 "No Fate (R.O.O.S. Mix 1)" – 7:44
 "No Fate (R.O.O.S. Mix 2)" – 7:44
 "No Fate (Trance Mix)" – 7:04

12"
 "No Fate (Full Length)" – 6:24
 "No Fate (Trance Mix)" – 7:04
 "No Fate (R.O.O.S. Mix 1)" – 7:44
 "No Fate (R.O.O.S. Mix 2)" – 7:44

Charts

References

Scooter (band) songs
1992 singles
1997 singles
Songs written by H.P. Baxxter
Songs written by Rick J. Jordan
Songs written by Jens Thele
1992 songs
1997 songs